Khaosokia is a monotypic genus of flowering plants belonging to the family Cyperaceae. The only species is Khaosokia caricoides.

Its native range is Thailand.

References

Cyperaceae
Cyperaceae genera
Monotypic Poales genera